Kuma (Turkish: "concubine") is a 2012 Austrian film directed by Umut Dag about a Turkish immigrant family living in Vienna. Umut Dag’s mature feature debut is a rich tapestry of swirling emotions, suppressed desires, unspoken words and uncomfortable yet pressing social and political questions.

Plot
Fatma, a housewife around 50, lives in Vienna with her husband Mustafa and their six children. She grew up in Turkey and clings to the traditions and values of the old country. Her son Hasan gets married in rural Turkey to the 19-year old Ayse. When the family takes Ayse to Vienna this is revealed as a charade. Ayse is to be the kuma (second wife) of Fatma’s husband Mustafa. Ayse is welcomed by the family, although polygamy is illegal in Austria. Her presence in a foreign country marks her as an outsider. Tension grows between Western norms and Muslim beliefs.

Cast
Nihal G. Koldas as Fatma
Begüm Akkaya as Ayse
Vedat Erincin as Mustafa
Murathan Muslu as Hasan
Alev Imak as Kezvan
Aliye Esra Salebci as Gülsen

Reception
Kuma has won several international awards including the Special Audience Prize at the 2012 Lecce Festival of European Cinema and the Golden Starfish Award at the 2012 Hamptons International Film Festival. At the 2012 Philadelphia Film Festival Begüm Akkaya won Honorable Mention in the category of Best Actress. The film was nominated for Best Debut Film at the 62nd Berlin International Film Festival.

Writing for The Guardian, Peter Bradshaw rated the film three stars out of five, and described it as "strongly and honestly acted", with "a strong hint of soapy melodrama". In a review for The Telegraph, Tim Robey awarded Kuma the same rating and described it as a "vigorous and engrossing debut".

References

External links

2012 films
Austrian drama films
2010s German-language films
2010s Turkish-language films
2012 multilingual films
Austrian multilingual films
2012 drama films